Dimitrios Gianniotis (born 28 January 1999) is a Greek professional footballer who plays as a centre-back for Super League 2 club Karaiskakis.

References

1999 births
Living people
Greek footballers
Super League Greece players
Super League Greece 2 players
Panetolikos F.C. players
A.E. Karaiskakis F.C. players
Association football defenders
Footballers from Agrinio
21st-century Greek people